Pagash, pagach, or pagac—also known as pierogi pizza—is a food made of mashed potatoes, dough, and cheese. It may also include cabbage in addition to the potatoes. It originated as a Lenten dish in Slavic regions. It is popular in Northeastern Pennsylvania and Southwestern Pennsylvania, which has been shaped by the large population of Catholic immigrants from those regions.

Description 
Pagash is a food made of mashed potatoes and dough. It may be called Slavic pizza or Polish pizza. Pierogi pizza is a related dish made with similar ingredients.

Origin 
The food originated as a Lenten dish in Slavic regions. It is popular in Northeastern Pennsylvania and Southwestern Pennsylvania, which has been shaped by the large population of Catholic immigrants from those regions. It may be spelled pagash, pagach, or pagac.

Recipe 
A modern Pennsylvania pagash dish typically consists of mashed potatoes or sautéed cabbage baked between or on top of pizza crust. The potatoes or cabbage will often contain additives that may include butter, onions, cheese, and seasonings. Cheese may also be placed on top of the dish.

See also 
 Lent
 Pogača
 Pierogi
 Slavic culture
 Zapiekanka

References 

Slavic Easter traditions
Lenten foods
Cuisine of Pennsylvania
Potato dishes
Cabbage dishes